Junosuando is a locality situated in Pajala Municipality, Norrbotten County, Sweden with 322 inhabitants in 2010. It was founded in 1637.

References

External links

Populated places in Pajala Municipality
Norrbotten
Populated places in Arctic Sweden